Rossair may refer to:

Rossair (Australia) - an air charter company based in Australia
Rossair Executive Air Charter - a defunct South African air charter company
Rossair Europe - a defunct Dutch airline